Tomas Delininkaitis (born June 11, 1982) is a Lithuanian professional basketball player. He was a member of the Lithuanian national basketball team at the 2010 FIBA World Championship . He is 1.90 m (6 ft 2  in) and weighs 82 kg.

Professional career
Delininkaitis established his career in Lietuvos Rytas. Alongside Robertas Javtokas and Simas Jasaitis, he led Rytas to an ULEB Cup (now called EuroCup) trophy in 2005, although Rytas lost the LKL and BBL titles to their Lithuanian rivals Žalgiris that season.

In the next season, Rytas played in the EuroLeague, where Delininkaitis began to fade away from his leadership role in the team, and he was left only as a reserve player. Still, Rytas had their best season that year, winning their easiest LKL Finals series (4–0) against Žalgiris. In his last season with Rytas, Delininkaits was the team's sixth man, and he helped Rytas reach their 2nd ULEB Cup (EuroCup) final, which they lost to Real Madrid 75–87. In 2007, he signed with Azovmash Mariupol. In 2009, he joined Budivelnyk Kyiv. After playing a fraction of the 2008–2009 season, he moved to CB Murcia to start his 2009–2010 season. After the relegation and the financial problems of Murcia, his contract was terminated, and he joined PAOK, in April 2010. He appeared in 6 games (4 games of the regular season and 2 play-off games) for the Greek side, and he averaged 10.33 points, 2 rebounds, and 2.1 assists per game.

After winning a bronze medal with the senior Lithuanian national basketball team, in the 2010 FIBA World Championship, he was signed by Žalgiris Kaunas, and became a key player for the team.

On November 5, 2014, he signed with AEK Athens of the Greek Basket League. In 25 regular season games, he averaged 9.76 points, 1.4 rebounds, and 1.5 assists per game

On January 12, 2016, he signed with Rethymno of the Greek Basket League, for the rest of the season.

On August 12, 2016, he signed with Vytautas Prienai-Birštonas. In April, he helped BC Vytautas win the BBL championship, becoming the MVP in the process. Later he was named to the LKL All-Tournament Team on June 13, 2017.

On July 20, 2017, he signed with Neptūnas Klaipėda.

National team career
At the 2010 FIBA World Championship, Delininkaitis played for the senior Lithuanian national basketball team, which won the tournament's bronze medal.

Career statistics

EuroLeague

|-
| style="text-align:left;"| 2005–06
| style="text-align:left;"| Lietuvos Rytas
| 19 || 2 || 14.2 || .400 || .264 || .714 || 1.1 || 1.0 || .5 || .0 || 5.2 || 2.4
|-
| style="text-align:left;"| 2010–11
| style="text-align:left;"| Žalgiris
| 16 || 5 || 19.3 || .344 || .388 || .851 || 1.9 || 2.0 || .5 || .0 || 8.8 || 8.1
|-
| style="text-align:left;"| 2011–12
| style="text-align:left;"| Žalgiris
| 16 || 4 || 10.5 || .464 || .467 || .682 || .8 || .9 || .4 || .0 || 5.2 || 3.3

Awards and achievements

Pro clubs
3× Lithuanian League Champion: 2006, 2011, 2012
4× BBL Champion: 2006, 2007, 2011, 2012
EuroCup Champion: 2005
Eurocup Runner-up: 2007
BBL Runner-up: 2005
3× LKL Runner-up: 2004, 2005, 2007
Ukrainian League Champion: 2008

Lithuanian national team
2010 FIBA World Championship, Turkey:

References

External links

Euroleague.net Profile
TBLStat.net Profile
Eurobasket Profile

1982 births
Living people
AEK B.C. players
BC Azovmash players
BC Budivelnyk players
BC Cherkaski Mavpy players
BC Rytas players
BC Žalgiris players
BK VEF Rīga players
CB Murcia players
Greek Basket League players
Liga ACB players
Lithuanian men's basketball players
BC Neptūnas players
P.A.O.K. BC players
Point guards
Rethymno B.C. players
Shooting guards
Basketball players from Klaipėda
Torku Konyaspor B.K. players
2010 FIBA World Championship players
2006 FIBA World Championship players